List of speakers of the Assembly of the Republic (Northern Cyprus)-

Below is a list of office-holders:

References

See also
Assembly of the Republic (Northern Cyprus)

Northern Cyprus, Assembly of the Republic
Turkish Cypriot politicians
Northern Cyprus

tr:KKTC Cumhuriyet Meclisi#Cumhuriyet Meclisi başkanları